The 1908 OPHL season was the first season of the Ontario Professional Hockey League. The Toronto Professional Hockey Club had the best record to win the league championship.

Regular season

Final standings 

Source:

Exhibitions 
After the season, a game was held in Toronto between the Torontos and an All-Star team composed of players from the other teams.
Toronto would defeat the All-Stars 16–10.

Playoffs 
After the season, Toronto would challenge the ECAHA champion Montreal Wanderers for the Stanley Cup. Toronto would impress the Wanderers with their quality of play, but were defeated 6–4 on March 14 on two late goals by Ernie Johnson and Bruce Stuart.

References 

 

OPHL
Ontario Professional Hockey League